Christian IV, Count Palatine of Zweibrücken-Birkenfeld (6 September 1722 in Bischweiler – 5 November 1775 in Herschweiler-Pettersheim) was Duke of Zweibrücken from 1735 to 1775.

Early life and family
Christian IV was born in Bischweiler on 6 September 1722, the son of Christian III, Count Palatine of Zweibrücken and his wife, Caroline of Nassau-Saarbrücken.

Marriage and issue
In 1751 he married, morganatically, Maria Johanna Camasse (1734–1807, created Countess of Forbach in 1757).  They had six children, who were unable to succeed to their father's Duchy due to the morganatic nature of their parents' marriage at first, but in 1792 were allowed to carry the name Freiherr von Zweibrücken:

 Christian, Count of Forbach, Marquis of Deux-Ponts (1752–1817), Royal Bavarian General der Infanterie
 Philippe Guillaume (later renamed to Wilhelm), Count of Forbach, Viscount of Deux-Ponts (1754–1807)
 Maria Anna Caroline von Zweibrücken (1756–1806)
 Karl Ludwig, Baron of Zweybrücken (1759–63)
 Elisabeth Auguste Friederike von Zweibrücken (1766–1836)
 Julius August Maximilian, Baron of Zweybrücken (1771–73)

His grandson Christian Freiherr von Zweibrücken (1782–1859, son of Philipp Guillaume) was a Royal Bavarian General der Kavallerie and Generalkapitän of the Hartschiere.

Ancestry

See also 
Hôtel des Deux-Ponts

References 

1722 births
1775 deaths
House of Palatinate-Zweibrücken
Counts Palatine of Zweibrücken
House of Wittelsbach
Burials at the Alexanderkirche, Zweibrücken